Events in the year 2023 in Ukraine.

Incumbents 
 President: Volodymyr Zelenskyy
 Prime Minister: Denys Shmyhal

Ongoing 
 Russian invasion of Ukraine (2022–present)

Events 
18 January – A helicopter crash killed 14 people.
23 January - In other regions of Ukraine (the city of Kyiv, and Cherkasy, Chernihiv, Ivano-Frankivsk, Kharkiv, Kherson, Kirovohrad, Kyiv, Mykolaiv, Odesa, Sumy, Zaporizhzhia, Dnipropetrovsk, Khmelnytskyi, Poltava, Rivne, Ternopil, Vinnytsia, Volyn, and Zhytomyr regions), which were under Government control when casualties occurred: 8,580 casualties (2,947 killed and 5,633 injured)

Projected and scheduled events 
No later than 29 October: Next Ukrainian parliamentary election

Deaths

January 
 1 January – Bohdan Rebryk, 84, political prisoner and politician, MP (1990–1994).
 4 January – Volodymyr Radchenko, 74, politician and intelligence officer, vice prime minister (2007), minister of internal affairs (1994–1995) and twice head of the SBU.
 11 January – Pavlo Naumenko, 57, aerospace engineer.
 12 January – Valentyna Lutayeva, 66, handball player, Olympic champion (1980).
 14 January – Ruslan Otverchenko, 33, basketball player (BC Budivelnyk, SC Prometey, national team).
 18 January – Denys Monastyrsky, 42, lawyer and politician, incumbent Minister of Internal Affairs (2021–2023)

See also
 Outline of the Russo-Ukrainian War

References 

 
Ukraine
Ukraine
2020s in Ukraine
Years of the 21st century in Ukraine